

The SCDA O-1 was an Italian semi-rigid airship, the only true semi-rigid airship to serve with the United States Navy.

Operational service

The O-1 was ordered from Stabilimento Costruzioni Dirigibili ed Aerostati (SCDA) by the United States Navy. Its first flight was made at Ciampino, Italy, on 27 March 1919. Following tests, it was sent from Genoa, Italy, leaving on 24 May 1919. It was sent to Akron for study and was then erected at the airship base at Cape May, New Jersey. The O-1 first flew in the USA on 16 September 1919. While operating from Cape May, the O-1 lost all power on a landing approach and was blown to near Pennsville, New Jersey where the crew managed to land it. The O-1 was eventually returned to service and while on temporary duty at Hampton Roads the O-1 was used to launch gliders designed to be anti-aircraft targets. The date the O-1 was scrapped is not known, but was probably in the winter of 1921–22.

Operators

United States Navy

Specifications O-1
 Crew: 3
 Volume:  127,000 cu ft
 Length:   177.8 ft)
 Diameter:  35.4 ft
 Gross lift:  9,125 lbs
 Empty weight:  5,850 lbs
 Useful lift: 3,290 lbs
 Keel: Articulated steel
 Powerplant: Two, Colombo, 125 hp

References
Shock, James R., "U.S. Navy Airships 1915–1962, Edgewater, Florida, Atlantis Productions, 2001, 

Airships of the United States Navy
Airships of Italy
1910s Italian aircraft
1910s United States aircraft
Aircraft first flown in 1919